Ryu Ho-jeong (born 9 August 1992) is a South Korean politician. She is a member of the National Assembly representing the Justice Party. She was elected for the first time in the 2020 election via proportional representation in first position on her party's list, and is the youngest member of the National Assembly in the 2020–2024 term.

Early life and education
Ryu Ho-jeong was born in Changwon, South Gyeongsang Province in 1992. She attended Changwon Kyungil Girls' High before studying at Ewha Womans University from 2011 to 2016, earning a bachelor's degree in sociology.

While at Ewha Womans University, Ryu was president of "Klass Ewha", an esports game club. In 2014, she also admitted to having "boosted" her account in League of Legends, a video game especially popular in South Korea, by allowing other players to share the account to raise it to a higher rank or status. Account boosting is taken much more seriously in South Korea than in other places, and has since been outlawed there.

Career
Ryu started her career as a Twitch streamer and online broadcaster before becoming active in politics. She was later a delegate to the Justice Party national congress in November 2018. From 2018 to 2020 she was director of the public relations department at the National Chemical Fiber Food Industry Union. In July 2019, Ryu became vice chair of the Seongnam City branch of the Justice Party. At the end of the 2020, she became director of public relations strategy and vice-president of the national party.

In the 2020 legislative election, Ryu was elected to the National Assembly via the proportional representation component, despite adverse publicity about her previous esport game account boosting. She was top candidate of the Justice Party's proportional list; the party won six seats overall, and 2.7 million votes (9.7%). At age 27, she became the youngest member of the National Assembly, in which she is a member of the Special Committee on Ethics and the Trade, Industry, Energy, SMEs, and Startups Committee.

In August 2020, Ryu was subject to online abuse after wearing a red patterned mini wrap dress and black sneakers in the National Assembly chamber. Critics derided her appearance and claimed that her outfit was inappropriate. She was defended by a number of other politicians and public figures, including former presidential spokesperson Ko Min-jung, who commended her for "breaking the National Assembly's excessively solemn and authoritarian atmosphere". In an interview with Yonhap, Ryu explained: "In every plenary session, most lawmakers, male and middle-aged, show up in a suit and a tie, so I wanted to shatter that tradition. The authority of the national assembly is not built on those suits." The incident played into the ongoing reckoning over sexism and gender equality in South Korea.

Political positions
Ryu is a member of the Justice Party. She has said that she wishes to create the "first progressive opposition party with a clear voice for the socially disadvantaged." She holds progressive positions on various issues such as LGBT rights, homelessness, workers' rights, and women's rights. She supports the legalisation and destigmatisation of tattooing.

References

External links
YouTube
Facebook

1992 births
Living people
Members of the National Assembly (South Korea)
South Korean feminists
South Korean progressives
South Korean social democrats
Ewha Womans University alumni
South Korean LGBT rights activists
People from South Gyeongsang Province
Left-libertarians
Liberalism in South Korea
Justice Party (South Korea) politicians
Justice Party (South Korea)
South Korean atheists
Female members of the National Assembly (South Korea)